The 17 October affair was an event during which Indonesian soldiers pressured the president to disband the Provisional People's Representative Council, at the behest of the administration's chief of staff, along with the commander of the armed forces.  The demand was made of President Sukarno while the Merdeka Palace was surrounded.  It is named for taking place on 17 October 1952.

Due to tensions regarding potential army reorganization to conserve budgets, the Indonesian Army's high command came into dispute with the parliament in what it saw as excessive civilian meddling within military affairs. After a dismissal of a pro-government officer in July 1952, the parliament began demanding a significant restructuring of armed forces leadership, and after three months tensions culminated in thousands of demonstrators mobilized by the army in Jakarta. Sukarno managed to temper the demonstrators and assure the army officers, but refused to concede to any demands. Soon after the incident, a significant proportion of the army's high command was replaced, including Nasution and Simatupang.

Background
During 1952, the newly independent Indonesian government faced a fiscal crisis due to a drop in government revenues and current account deficits as the economic boom due to the Korean War levelled out. Government officials under the Wilopo Cabinet began cutting down on expenses including civilian and military servicemen, which would include 60,000 soldiers being retired. Demobilization after the Indonesian National Revolution had been occurring in the past, but not many had been forcefully retired. Beyond the demobilization, the Indonesian Army had also been undergoing a "reorganization" program involving many demotions or transfers of local military commanders, which was unpopular among them. This generally split the army into two factions: those who preferred reorganization and worked with the civilian administration's budget reduction programs, and the traditional military officers at risk of reorganization, including many officers trained by Japanese occupation forces prior to independence, under the PETA organization. This reorganization process had been coordinated by the Army's leadership, including Armed Forces Chief Tahi Bonar Simatupang and Army Chief of Staff Abdul Haris Nasution. 

For 1952, three-quarters of the army's budget was spent on salaries, limiting the number of purchasable equipment for renewal and even then the salary allocations were minimal. In mid-1952, the army reorganizers decided to begin a demobilization which would reduce 80,000 soldiers out of 200,000 at that time, to begin in late that year. While pensions would be provided, the plan was unpopular among many of the rank and file to be discharged, and among the traditional officers. These traditional officers had strong connections with President Sukarno's Indonesian National Party (PNI) and other opposition parties. Sukarno himself had been opposed to many of the changes which occurred in the army, and had on occasion intervened on the personnel policy. Between June and July 1952, one Colonel Bambang Supeno, a distant relative of Sukarno's, began to gather support to petition for the removal of Nasution from army leadership. After a tense meeting of regional commanders and a letter from Supeno criticizing his superiors to the civilian government, he was removed from his post on 17 July. Supeno was one of the most senior army officers who had formulated an official military code of principles, and was a supporter of the "traditional" faction, espousing that the army should focus on local defense and the use of abundant manpower.

Following Supeno's dismissal, the parliament began issuing demands to restructure the Indonesian Army's leadership and the Ministry of Defense, in particular removing Simatupang and Nasution. The military leadership saw this as excessive civilian interference on defense affairs, and began holding meetings to discuss a countermove. The Wilopo Cabinet itself suffered from infighting regarding the demands, with the Indonesian Socialist Party and the Indonesian Christian Party threatening to withdraw from the government coalition should Defense Minister Hamengkubuwono IX be removed. On 23 September, a motion of no-confidence on the defence ministry's policies by parliamentary defence section secretary Zainul Baharuddin, cosigned by the Murba Party and the Labour Party members, was submitted. On 10 October, a modified motion was submitted, in an attempt to draw the Indonesian National Party's support. Around that time, the highest-ranking army regional commanders had gathered in Jakarta for a meeting, including Maludin Simbolon, A. E. Kawilarang, and Gatot Subroto. The situation in early October was tense, with military guards posted to the parliament building. Baharuddin's motion was shot down on 15 October, and a more moderate motion that had been proposed by I. J. Kasimo of the Catholic Party two days earlier was instead approved by the government. More importantly, however, a stronger motion by PNI's Manai Sophiaan, which if approved would allow civilian politicians to alter the leadership of the armed forces, also passed on 16 October.

Events
In the morning of 17 October 1952, thousands of demonstrators brought into Jakarta by army trucks arrived in front of the parliament building. The demonstrators demanded the dissolution of parliament, carrying placards with related messages. There were around 5,000 people by 8 AM, and they broke into the parliament building where they smashed chairs and damaged the cafeteria. The group was apparently organized by Colonel Moestopo, head of the army's dental service. The crowd moved across the city, growing in size as some bystanders joined in. The group collectively presented a petition to Vice President Mohammad Hatta, and in several occasions Dutch flags were taken off flagpoles and torn up. By the time they arrived in front of the Merdeka Palace, there were some 30,000 people in the crowd. Beyond the large crowd, the army also positioned several tanks and artillery pieces pointed at the presidential palace. The demonstrators remained in the front of the palace's fences. While this was ongoing, Nasution did not physically participate as he did not want to appear involved with the movement, and had instead invited UN Representative John Reid for lunch.

Shortly after the arrival of the crowd, President Sukarno walked out and addressed the crowd from the steps of the presidential palace, promising elections in the short term. Sukarno denied the demonstrators' request to dissolve parliament, however, stating that such actions would be dictatorial. This speech managed to largely calm down the demonstrators, and after the conclusion of his speech he received cheers and the crowd largely dispersed. Sometime past 10 AM, seventeen high-ranking officers including five of the seven army territorial commanders met the president. The closed-door meeting lasted for an hour and a half, and also involved Hatta, Wilopo, Cabinet Secretary , and parliament speaker A. M. Tambunan. The army officers reportedly also demanded the president to dissolve parliament. According to historian Ruth McVey, the officers would have likely accepted a compromise whereas the parliament would remain but would no longer interfere with army leadership. Sukarno, however, refused to either dissolve parliament, to make public statements supporting the army, or to propose a compromise otherwise, and he sent away the officers after previously promising that he would satisfy all parties.

Once the officers had left the palace, still on 17 October, Sukarno spoke in a broadcast to appeal for calm. Telephone and telegraph connections in Jakarta was ceased that day starting on 11 AM, and a curfew was implemented, with meetings over five people being restricted. Six parliament members (including former prime minister Soekiman Wirjosandjojo) were arrested and several newspapers were banned, though after three days the bans, arrests, and other measures had been lifted and army activity in Jakarta which had increased significantly returned to normal.

Impact
The army had failed to achieve its objective in mobilizing demonstrators to coerce Sukarno, and the army's high command would face replacements both internal and external. Three of the seven territorial commanders were removed by their own subordinates within October. In the four cities serving as headquarters to the unchanged territorial commands – Medan, Bandung, Semarang and Banjarmasin – anti-parliament demonstrations occurred after 17 October. Once the parliament had reconvened in late November, both Simatupang and Nasution were removed from their posts, with Simatupang's office being abolished and Nasution being replaced by Bambang Sugeng. The affair and the ensuing coups in the territorial commands deprived the army's high command of significant powers, while strengthening local officers and the overall armed forces command. Continued disputes between the army and the parliament also forced local territorial commands to seek their own sources of funding beyond the central government through deals with local businesses, and this grew to a point where this income exceeded central budgets. It also strengthened the traditionalist officers at the expense of the more modern, professional ones. Under Sugeng, the army attempted to resolve this issue of factionalism, but failed and once Sugeng resigned in 1955 Nasution returned to his post as Army Chief of Staff.

References

Bibliography

Further reading

Indonesian Army
October 1952 events in Asia
1952 in Indonesia
20th century in Jakarta
Sukarno